The Turkwel River (sometimes spelled Turkwell River) is a river flowing from Mount Elgon on the border of Kenya and Uganda to Lake Turkana. The river is called the Suam River from its source to the border at Turkana County of Kenya. The name Turkwel is derived from the Turkana name for the river, Tir-kol, which means a river that "withstands the wilderness". The Turkwel begins on the lush green slopes of Mount Elgon and the Cherangani Hills, then traverses the Southern Turkana Plains, crosses the Loturerei Desert near Lodwar and empties into the world's largest desert lake, Lake Turkana. The river's flow is seasonally varied, and it is subject to flash floods in the rainy season.

The controversial Turkwel Dam was built by the Kenyan government from 1986 to 1991 with the help of France. The plan was to harness the waters of the Turkwel. The project was initially supposed to cost KSh.4 billion/=, but ended up costing more than KSh.20 billion/=.  The dam partially filled the Turkwel Gorge and created the Turkwel Gorge Reservoir.

References 

Rivers of Kenya
Mount Elgon
Tributaries of Lake Turkana
West Pokot County